Yeva may refer to:

Yeva, sometimes Eva, an Armenian equivalent of Eve 
Yeva (band), a Latin fusion band formed by Harold Hopkins Miranda
Yeva (film), 2017 Armenian drama film directed by Anahit Abad
Yeva Vybornova (born 1974), Ukrainian fencer
Yeva-Genevieve Lavlinski, actress and film director from the USSR

See also
Eve (name)
Yevanic language, also known as Judæo-Greek, Romaniyot, Romaniote, and Yevanitika[4] is a Greek dialect formerly used by the Romaniotes and by the Constantinopolitan Karaites (in whose case the language is called Karaitika or Karæo-Greek)
Yeva-Liv Island or Eva-Live Island, also known as Eva Island, is the northeasternmost island in Franz Josef Land, Arkhangelsk Oblast, Russian Arctic